"You're a Hard Dog (To Keep Under the Porch)" is a song written by Susanna Clark and Harlan Howard. It was originally recorded by American country artist Gail Davies for her fifth studio album entitled What Can I Say.

The song was recorded in June 1983 at the "Woodland Studio", located in Nashville, Tennessee, United States. The session was produced entirely by Davies, who had been self-producing her recording sessions for several years. Released as a single in September 1983, "You're a Hard Dog (To Keep Under the Porch)" reached the eighteenth position on the Billboard Magazine Hot Country Singles chart. The single became Davies' ninth top-twenty hit on the Billboard country chart. In addition, the single peaked within the top-twenty on the Canadian RPM Country Tracks chart.

Chart performance

References 

1983 songs
1983 singles
Gail Davies songs
Songs written by Harlan Howard
Song recordings produced by Gail Davies
Warner Records singles